Saint-Étienne-de-Baïgorry is a commune in the Pyrénées-Atlantiques department in south-western France. It is part of the former province of Lower Navarre. It borders the municipality of Baztan to the west (Spain, access via the Izpegi Pass).

It is the main access to the Aldudes valley, having nearby the Castle, the river through the place being known as the river Nive des Aldudes.

The town is home to the renowned Day of Navarre, a festival attracting a massive turnout (by thousands) from the Spanish and French side of Navarre in early May intended to strengthen ties between both Navarrese territories and affirming their common Basque identity.

Canton

Saint-Étienne-de-Baïgorry was the chief town of the former canton of Saint-Étienne-de-Baïgorry. Its 11 communes had some 5,727 inhabitants on some 311 km2 in 2006, with decreasing population. In 2015, the canton was merged into the new canton of Montagne Basque.

French Communes limiting with the town of Saint-Étienne de Baïgorry

 Bidarray, Northwards. 652 inhabitants in 2006. Some 30 km2. 
 Saint-Martin-d'Arrossa- North-East. 462 inhabitants in 2006. 
 Irouléguy. East. Famous vineyards for many years. 316 inhabitants in 2006, 
 Anhaux. South-West.280 inhabitants in 2006. 12.3 km2., 
 Banca. South. Some 373 inhabitants in 2006,

Demography
Saint-Étienne-de-Baïgorry has 1617 inhabitants, as of the 2006 census.

Transportation
Set in a mountainous area, Baigorri is communicated by departmental roads D15 and D948, with a coach line offering service to Ossès (Basque Ortzaize) within TER Aquitaine's network.

The Area as a part of the French GR10, French footpaths,(Grand Randonnée 10)

Main sights

Saint-Etienne church, in a Viscounty created in 1033 by King Sancho III of Navarre, is mentioned in documents of 1253, but with a Baroque retable of the 17th century displaying the stoning of 1st century AD Saint Étienne
Château d'Etchaux, built in the 16th century by Viscount of Baïgorry

Coat of arms

The meaning in Basque is the “red bank of the river”, in this case the river Nive, flowing through Bayonne and discharging the waters in the 324 km long Adour River.

Notable people

 Jean Isidore Harispe, 1st Comte Harispe,  (Saint-Étienne-de-Baïgorry, 7 December 1768 - Lacarre,  26 May 1855), was a distinguished French soldier of the Revolutionary and Napoleonic Wars, as well as of the following period. Harispe was created a Marshal of France in 1851.
 Jean-Baptiste Etcheverry, general councillor of Basses-Pyrénées and deputy of the Second French Empire, was born in Saint-Étienne-de-Baïgorry in 1805.

See also
Communes of the Pyrénées-Atlantiques department

References

Communes of Pyrénées-Atlantiques
Lower Navarre
Pyrénées-Atlantiques communes articles needing translation from French Wikipedia